Burrough-on-the Hill is a small village and former civil parish, now in the parish of Somerby, in the Melton district, in the county of Leicestershire, England. The parish church is St. Mary the Virgin. Burrough Hill is an Iron Age hill fort near the village and is in an  country park of the same name. In 1931 the parish had a population of 214.

The village's name means 'fortification on the hill'. Though later forms of Old English show that it could mean 'the earthen fortification on the hill'.

On 1 April 1936 the parish was abolished and merged with Somerby.

The village shared John O' Gaunt railway station with the neighbouring village of Twyford. The station is adjacent to a 14-arch viaduct. Trains used to go north to Melton Mowbray, and south to Leicester and Market Harborough, but the line was closed in the 1960s. There is a local bus service to Melton Mowbray and Oakham.

Population

Famous Horses
British thoroughbred racehorse Burrough Hill Lad was named after Burrough on the Hill by owner Stan Riley, who was born and raised in the village. After a run of victories in 1984 including the Cheltenham Gold Cup, Hennessy Gold Cup and King George VI Chase, Burrough Hill Lad was considered one of the greatest racehorses in the history of the sport.

References

External links

Villages in Leicestershire
Former civil parishes in Leicestershire
Somerby, Leicestershire